Conus austroviola is a species of sea snail, a marine gastropod mollusk in the family Conidae, the cone snails and their allies.

Like all species within the genus Conus, these snails are predatory and venomous. They are capable of "stinging" humans, therefore live ones should be handled carefully or not at all.

Description
The size of the shell varies between 23 mm and 57 mm.

Distribution
This marine species is endemic to Australia and occurs off the Northern Territory, Queensland and Western Australia.

References

 Röckel, D. and Korn, W. 1992. New species and subspecies of the genus Conus (Mollusca: Neogastropoda) from the Indo-Pacific. Acta Conchyliorum 3(1):5–29, 3 pls.
 Wilson, B. 1994. Australian Marine Shells. Prosobranch Gastropods. Kallaroo, WA : Odyssey Publishing Vol. 2 370 pp.
 Röckel, D., Korn, W. & Kohn, A.J. 1995. Manual of the Living Conidae. Volume 1: Indo-Pacific Region. Wiesbaden : Hemmen 517 pp.
 Puillandre N., Duda T.F., Meyer C., Olivera B.M. & Bouchet P. (2015). One, four or 100 genera? A new classification of the cone snails. Journal of Molluscan Studies. 81: 1–23

External links
 The Conus Biodiversity website
 Cone Shells – Knights of the Sea
 

austroviola
Gastropods of Australia
Gastropods described in 1992